L'Antijuif was a French weekly newspaper and official organ of the Grand Occident de France, edited by anti-Dreyfusard Jules Guérin. Published in Paris from 1898 to 1899, over 40,000 copies were regularly printed, over half of which was distributed as free propaganda.

History

L'Antijuif was launched on 21 August 1898 as a daily in competition with La Libre Parole, with the financial support of the Duc d'Orléans and other substantial donations from individual royalists, such as Boni de Castellane. The newspaper established headquarters at 51  in Paris in April 1899.

The publication ceased with the imprisonment of Guérin—who defied arrest for five weeks at the newspaper's headquarters—for planning a coup d'état against the republic (alongside Paul Déroulède). The Ligue launched a successor periodical, Le petit antijuif de l'est, in 1900.

References

External links

1896 establishments in France
Antisemitism in France
Antisemitic publications
Defunct newspapers published in France
Dreyfus affair
Publications disestablished in 1899
Publications established in 1896